Carl "Charlie" Woebcken (born 1956) is a German film producer and President/CEO of Studio Babelsberg AG and Managing Director of the production service subsidiary Studio Babelsberg Motion Pictures as well as production company Babelsberg Film.

Biography 
Charlie Woebcken acquired Studio Babelsberg together with his business associate Christoph Fisser in July 2004 from the French media group Vivendi. They went public with the restructured Studio Babelsberg at the German stock exchange in 2005.

Before operating in Babelsberg, Charlie Woebcken worked as a management consultant at The Boston Consulting Group and subsequently in the management board of the Roland Berger & Partner consultancy. From 1998 he served as Vice President of the production and distribution company TV Loonland AG in Munich and as CEO of the former Sony subsidiary Sunbow Entertainment in New York. With his involvement as producer and co-producer films like Petterson and Findus were produced.

As head of programming at Berlin Animation Film GmbH (BAF), he acted as co-producer on a range of projects from 2002 until 2004, including the CGI feature film Happily N'Ever After.

Selected credits 
Co-producer:

V for Vendetta (2005)
Casino Royale (2006)
The Counterfeiters (2007)
Flame & Citron (2007)
Speed Racer (2007)
Valkyrie (2007)
The International (2007)
The Reader (2008)
Inglourious Basterds (2008)
The Ghost Writer (2009)
Anonymous (2011)
The Book Thief (2013)
The Monuments Men (2014)
The Hunger Games: Mockingjay – Part 1 (2014)
Bridge of Spies (2015)
The Hunger Games: Mockingjay – Part 2 (2015)
Point Break (2015)
Captain America: Civil War (2016)
Renegades (2016)
A Cure for Wellness (2017)
The Girl in the Spider's Web (2018)
Charlie's Angels (2019)
The Matrix 4 (2021)
Uncharted (2022)

Executive Producer:
The Voices (2015)
The Grand Budapest Hotel (2014)
Isle of Dogs (2018)
A Hidden Life (2019)
The French Dispatch

External links 

Boston Consulting Group people
German film producers
Living people
German management consultants
1956 births

de:Carl Woebcken